John L. Nau, III is the chairman and CEO of Silver Eagle Beverages, one of the largest Anheuser-Busch distributors in the nation.  Silver Eagle employs more than 500 employees who service a territory that includes the greater San Antonio area in Bexar County and extends over 12 additional counties in southwest Texas. Silver Eagle Beverages distributes Grupo Modelo beers, a broad selection of national and local craft beers and several non-alcohol beverages and waters. 

Nau’s commitment to service is apparent through a broad spectrum of participation in civic, community, and philanthropic organizations in Texas and throughout the country. His current involvement includes Chairman of the Texas Historical Commission, National Park Foundation Board of Directors, American Battlefield Trust Board of Directors, Abraham Lincoln Presidential Library Foundation Board of Directors, Andrew Jackson Foundation Board of Trustees, Baylor College of Medicine Board of Trustees, Gilder Lehrman Institute of American History Board of Trustees, University of Houston Board of Visitors, Honorary Trustee of Texas Heart Institute, Honorary State Trustee for the San Antonio Parks Foundation, Advisory Council Member to the Center for Big Bend Studies and George W. Bush Presidential Center Executive Advisory Council. He also serves as a board member for Friends of Vicksburg National Military Park, Houston Police Foundation, San Antonio Zoo and The Admiral Nimitz Foundation.

Nau has a personal interest in American history, and he has served as chairman of the national Advisory Council on Historic Preservation, 2001-2010, a position appointed by the President of the United States. He also served as chairman of the Texas Historical Commission, 1995-2009, a position appointed by the Governor of Texas.

He is a graduate of the University of Virginia, where he earned a Bachelor of Arts in history and formerly served on the board of visitors, a position appointed by the governor of the Commonwealth of Virginia. He also serves as vice chairman and on the executive committee for the University of Virginia Capital Campaign. The Corcoran Department of History building at UVA is named Nau Hall after he provided a lead $11 million gift as part of a larger $44 million commitment toward the study of democracy and history.

Nau resides in Houston, Texas. He has two daughters: Elizabeth Nau Stepanian and husband Andy, Victoria Nau Johnson and husband Parker, and five grandchildren: Katharine, Reese and Driggs Stepanian and Liston and Case Johnson.

Nau has been a major contributor to the Republican Party, particularly Texas Republicans. Nau has served as the national finance chairman of Texas Senator and former NRSC Chairman John Cornyn. Nau is also a major contributor to American Crossroads and Texas Governor Greg Abbott.

References

University of Virginia alumni
Businesspeople from Houston
Texas Republicans
Living people
Year of birth missing (living people)
20th-century American businesspeople
21st-century American businesspeople